Il commissario De Vincenzi (Inspector De Vincenzi) is an Italian television crime series, starring Paolo Stoppa in the title role.

External links
 

Italian crime television series
1974 Italian television series debuts
1977 Italian television series endings
1970s Italian television series